The Hits Tour was a concert tour performed by Mexican singer Luis Miguel.

History

The tour started in Fresno and then participated in the "People in Spanish Festival" in San Antonio. He visited various cities in the United States and Mexico such as Ciudad Juarez, Tijuana, Mexicali, Irvine, Highland and Las Vegas.

He flew to South America for concerts in Argentina (Corrientes, Buenos Aires, Cordoba and Rosario) and Chile (Antofagasta, Santiago, Mostazal and Concepcion).

In 2013, he went to Mexico to make 34 presentations across the country. The cities visited were: Mexico City, Pachuca, Aguascalientes, Guadalajara, Leon, Tampico, Monterrey, Tepic, Chihuahua, Hermosillo, Cualiacan, Acapulco, and Puebla.

In August 2013 he participated in the "North Sea Jazz Festival" in Curacao. In September 2013, he held concerts in the United States in the following cities: El Paso, Las Vegas, Temecula, Tucson, Palm Springs, Reno, Bakersfield, Dallas and Austin.

In November, he continued his tour in Dominican Republic, Peru, Venezuela and returned to four cities in Colombia after 9 years (he last visited that country during the 33 Tour in 2004).

Tour set list

Tour dates

Cancelled shows

Awards and records
 On September 2, 2012, in the "People in Spanish Festival" Miguel was awarded a "Lifetime Achievement Award" and proclaimed "Mayor for a Day" in the city of San Antonio, Texas. 
 Miguel received, on October 22, 2012, in Argentina at the hands of President Cristina Kirschner, a plaque in recognition of his 100 presentations in that country (1982–2012).  
 In October 2012 he was named "distinguished guest" by the city of Antofagasta. 
 On September 13, 2013, in Las Vegas, Miguel was awarded with "Diamond Award", a certificate from the Nevada Governor's Office for his contributions to the state, a certificate from the United States Senate recognizing him as one of the top Hispanic artists in the world, and "Day of Luis Miguel".
 In April 2014 Miguel won a "Billboard Latin Music Award": "Tour of the Year".

Band
Piano: Francisco Loyo
Acoustic & Electric Guitar: Todd Robinson
Bass: Lalo Carrillo
Keyboards & Programming: Salo Loyo
Drums: Victor Loyo
Percussion: Tommy Aros
Saxophone: Jeff Nathanson
Trumpet: Ramón Flores
Trumpet: Peter Olstad
Trombone: Alejandro Carballo
Backing Vocals: Lucila Polak (2012), Kasia Sowinska (2012–2013)

Notes

References

Luis Miguel concert tours
2012 concert tours
2013 concert tours